Olia is a closed vessel made up of straw or bamboo.

Olia may also refer to:

 Ontologies of Linguistic Annotation (OLiA)
 Olia Chain, a hill chain in Australia

People with the given name
 Olia Berger (born 1983), female judoka from Canada
 Olia Burtaev (born 1995), Australian synchronised swimmer
 Olia Hercules (born 1984), Ukrainian chef, food writer and food stylist
 Olia Lialina (born 1971), Russian internet artist and theorist, experimental film and video critic
 Olia Mishchenko (born 1980), Canadian artist
 Olia Tira (born 1988), Moldovan singer

See also
 Olya (disambiguation)
 Auliya (disambiguation)